Andrew Scott Pascal (born November 3, 1965) is an American businessman. He is the founder, CEO, and chairman of Play Studios, a consumer gambling company focused on the free-to-play social and mobile gambling market.  He is also the managing partner of Pascal Ventures, a venture firm incubating and investing in digital gambling and leisure.  He was previously president and chief operating officer of Wynn Las Vegas (from 2005 to 2010), the president and CEO of WagerWorks (from 2001 to 2003), and its predecessor Silicon Gaming (from 1998 to 2001).

Personal life
Andrew Pascal was born on November 3, 1965 to Michael Pascal and Susan Pascal. He married his wife Trina Pascal in 1995, and together had two children: Storey Pascal (born 1998) and Peri Pascal (born 2001). He has one sibling, his brother David Pascal.  His aunt is Elaine Wynn.

Career
Pascal started his career in the 1980s as a manager of slot machines at the Golden Nugget Las Vegas, then owned by his uncle, billionaire Steve Wynn. He later served as the chief executive officer of Silicon Gaming from 1998 to 2001, followed by WagerWorks from 2001 to 2003. Pascal sold both companies to International Game Technology (IGT) prior to moving to Las Vegas to open Wynn Las Vegas.

He joined Wynn Resorts as senior vice president of product marketing and development in 2003, serving in this capacity until 2005. He then served as the president and chief operating officer of Wynn Las Vegas from 2005 until his resignation in late 2010.

In late 2011, Pascal founded Play Studios, a consumer gambling company focused on the free-to-play social and mobile gambling market. He has been the president, chief executive officer, and chairman of the board since its founding. The company received investments from MGM Resorts International and Activision Blizzard. In 2012, its first game myVEGAS Slots was made available on Facebook.

In 2014, Pascal partnered with Crown Resorts, owned by billionaire James Packer, to develop Alon Las Vegas.  On August 5,  2014, they acquired 35 acres on the northern end of the Las Vegas Strip for $280 million, where the New Frontier Hotel and Casino once stood, to develop the new $2.4 billion resort, with additional investments from Oaktree Capital Management, with the hopes of opening in late 2018. Crown announced in December 2016 that it was withdrawing from the project and seeking to sell its interest. Alon Leisure Management, LLC., led by Pascal, announced it was seeking other partners to proceed with the project.

References

1965 births
Living people
American casino industry businesspeople
American chief executives
American company founders
Businesspeople from Las Vegas
Nevada Democrats